Marek Langhamer (born 22 July 1994) is a Czech professional ice hockey goaltender, currently playing for Ilves in the Finnish Liiga.

Playing career
After a few seasons playing as a youth within the HC Pardubice organization, Langhamer was selected in the 7th round, 184th overall by the Phoenix Coyotes during the 2012 NHL Entry Draft.

Following the draft, Langhamer transitioned to the Medicine Hat Tigers of the Western Hockey League. During his second season with the club, the Coyotes signed Langhamer to a three-year, entry-level contract on 8 May 2014.

Langhamer spent the first season of his North American professional career splitting time between the Coyotes' AHL and ECHL affiliates, the Springfield Falcons and the Rapid City Rush. Langhamer made his NHL debut when he replaced Coyotes' starting goaltender Mike Smith during a game on 20 February 2017.

During the 2017–18 season, with the Coyotes having a surplus of goaltending prospects and having played in limited games, the Coyotes loaned Langhamer to HC Kometa Brno in the Czech Extraliga on 9 December 2017. He made 9 appearances with Brno, collecting 6 wins.

In the following 2018–19 season, Langhamer continued his steady play with Kometa Brno, winning 5 games from 8 appearances, before opting to leave the club and accept a contract offer in the KHL with Russian club, Amur Khabarovsk, on 15 November 2018.

Langhamer has played in Ilves Tampere in Finnish Liiga since 2021.

Career statistics

Regular season and playoffs

International

Awards and honours

References

External links
 

1994 births
Living people
Amur Khabarovsk players
Arizona Coyotes draft picks
Arizona Coyotes players
Czech expatriate ice hockey players in the United States
Czech ice hockey goaltenders
Ilves players
HC Kometa Brno players
Medicine Hat Tigers players
Rapid City Rush players
Springfield Falcons players
Tucson Roadrunners players
People from Moravská Třebová
Sportspeople from the Pardubice Region
Czech expatriate ice hockey players in Canada
Czech expatriate ice hockey players in Russia
Czech expatriate ice hockey players in Finland